IAMX is the solo musical project of Chris Corner founded in 2002 in London, England after the hiatus of his former band Sneaker Pimps. It is an independent music project with a secondary focus on the experimentation of visual art.

Musically, IAMX spans across multiple genres. Ranging from electronic rock and dance music, to burlesque-influenced dark cabaret and emotional ballads. So it is Corner's striking and wide-ranging voice, his methodical way of programming sounds and beats, and complex production style that make up the obvious characteristic of the IAMX discography.

To date, IAMX has released eight studio albums, two remix albums, two experimental albums, two live albums, and one acoustic rework album all of which have been released independently and were written and produced solely by Corner with the exception of the fifth studio album The Unified Field, which was co-produced by Jim Abbiss, the experimental album Unfall which also features co-production and co-writing by Abbiss, and the acoustic album Echo Echo, which was co-produced by David Bottrill. Two more studio albums have been announced for release in the Spring and Fall of 2023.

From 2006 until 2014, IAMX was based in Berlin, Germany where Corner found "the spirit to care less about the music industry and take an independent route." Berlin became a large influence on IAMX's lyrics and sound. Inspiring subjects such as death, love, addiction, narcotic intoxication, and decadence. As well as the critique of religion, modern society, and politics, alienation, and the exploration of sexual identity and gender expression. With the topic of gender identity further emphasised by Corner's own distinctive and androgynous image both on and off stage.

It was during this time that IAMX became known for their highly energetic and theatrical live performances. With unusual stage outfits and body painting becoming core elements of IAMX shows. The visual art element of the project was also brought to fruition during this time. Intricate stage designs consisting of art and props, constructed by Corner and his live band members, were used alongside projections at their live shows.

The official IAMX music videos also started to be directed, filmed, and edited by Corner. With him later saying, "I adore video. There’s so much scope that music and visual together can achieve. I’ve always painted with sound and had strong images in my head when I made music, so moving into video was natural." Both the projections and music videos can contain strong and controversial content. This content is often explicit or is hidden as Easter eggs for fans to discover and in order to bypass censorship from various social media platforms.

In 2014, after battling chronic insomnia and depression, IAMX left Berlin and moved to California, stating: "I needed a big change of scenery. I had a few friends in Los Angeles and it seemed like the most relevant place for me, so I got on a boat and sailed over to the States." He now lives and works at Silent Valley Studios in Southern California.

Band History 
IAMX was founded by Corner in 2002, in London, England. The name 'I am X' refers to Becoming X, the title of the Sneaker Pimps debut album, but Corner explained that by founding IAMX, he no longer felt that he was becoming X, but rather that he was X. With the meaning of the X ever changing. "X represents the subconscious. It is Art, Sex, Truth. It is radical openness that we achieve in heightened states of creativity. It is the unquantifiable element in all pleasure and all pain. IAMX as a project is an alter ego; a second personality that I can play with and nurture."

Additionally, throughout the project's aesthetics, the X in IAMX can be periodically seen placed within brackets, like the unknown variable in a mathematical equation: {X} A reference to the works of the French philosopher Gilles Deleuze.

Kiss + Swallow (2004–2006) 
IAMX's debut album, Kiss + Swallow, was released in 2004 and consisted of melancholic, dark, 1980s-influenced electro music with lyrical content often referring to the psychology of sexual fantasy and role play, gender bending, the exploration of solitude, aggression, longing, codependency and mortality. It was, as all IAMX albums to follow, written, performed and produced by Corner himself. Kiss + Swallow was recorded in Corner's home studio in London called The Den.

Many of the songs were initially written by Corner for a fourth Sneaker Pimps album, but while the band was working on the album, it soon became clear that the songs did not suit the direction of Sneaker Pimps. The songs remained important to Corner however, so he decided to keep working on them for this separate project.

After the release of Kiss + Swallow, Corner went on tour with IAMX, playing sporadically throughout Europe and the US. The live line-up varied between a revolving cast of close friends including Sue Denim of Robots in Disguise (whose vocals are also featured on the album), Noel Fielding and Julian Barratt of The Mighty Boosh, James Cook of Nemo, Mary Ambrose, and the actress Julia Davis of Nighty Night.

Kiss + Swallow was released in the US on 17 June 2008. The US album included the previously unreleased track "I-Polaroids" and a remix of the title song by Moonbootica, and has a variant cover of the album artwork.

Between tours in 2005, Corner wrote and produced the soundtrack for the film Les Chevaliers du Ciel  and the second Robots in Disguise album, Get RID!.

The Alternative and Live in Warsaw (2006–2008) 
IAMX's second album, The Alternative, has it's first physical release in April 2006 in Europe, and it's European and UK digital release October 2007. In November 2007, it was released physically in the UK and Ireland, then in May 2008 it was released on Metropolis Records for the US audience. The European and US versions have variant covers, with the US version featuring black tape over the face on the cover, rather than the original yellow tape. European and US versions also featured alternate versions of several tracks such as a hidden instrumental string version of "Spit It Out", which was arranged and recorded by Audrey Morse, added production, and new backing vocals from Janine Gezang, who had recently joined the live line-up as backing vocalist, bassist, and keyboardist.

Janine Gezang's addition to the live lineup was announced alongside the news that Dean Rosenzweig would be on guitars and bass, and Tom Marsh on drums back in the summer of 2006. However, Corner began playing shows in support of The Alternative in April 2006, the same month of its European release, playing various festivals across Europe before embarking on a full fledged European and US tour with the live lineup mentioned above in tow.

A limited edition live album, Live in Warsaw, was released on 14 November 2008 on IAMX's own label, 61seconds. The performance was recorded in front of a live audience for the Polskie Radio Program III and later mixed by Corner in Berlin at IAMX2 studios. At the time, the album was exclusively available on the band's online shop, Boutique IAMX and was not made available for many years after it initially sold out. However, it has since been made available again for digital download and streaming via Corner's new label UNFALL Productions.

Kingdom of Welcome Addiction and Dogmatic Infidel Comedown OK (2009–2010) 
The third IAMX album, Kingdom of Welcome Addiction, was released on 19 May 2009. The album's release was preceded by the single "Think of England", which was made available for free download on 7 November 2008. 
This album had a heavier sound than the previous two albums, and utilized Gezang's soprano harmonization throughout. It also featured guest vocals by Imogen Heap on the track "My Secret Friend" with Corner directing the corresponding music video.

In early 2010, it was announced that Janine Gezang would remain on keyboards/synths, vocals and bass; while Rosenzweig and Marsh would be replaced by Alberto Álvarez on guitars, vocals, drums and bass, and Jon Harper on drums.  However, before the second half of the tour, in August 2010, Harper was replaced by MAX, a drum machine which was programmed and triggered by Corner.

When asked in an interview, "Where and what is the Kingdom of Welcome Addiction for IAMX?" Corner responded, "In a cold suburb of my sensual and  beloved Berlin. In the womb of IAMX. A place where the aches and pains of banality can be relieved. Vices, insecurities, stupidities cured.A little bit like Disney world but with lipstick, cynicism and wit."

A remixed and reworked version of the album entitled Dogmatic Infidel Comedown OK was released on 19 March 2010. The release featured reworks done by Corner himself under the alias of UNFALL, as well as remixes and covers by other artists, including Alec Empire, Terence Fixmer, Combichrist, Aesthetic Perfection and more. The artists featured on the album were all selected and asked to contribute by IAMX. The title of the remixed album is an anagram of the original album's title Kingdom of Welcome Addiction.

Volatile Times and The Unified Field (2011–2014) 

In April of 2010, Corner teased that he was working on his fourth studio album, which he referred to as IAMX4. Then, on 19 October 2010, it was announced that IAMX4 was now identified as Volatile Times. In early March 2011, the week before the album's release, the track "Fire and Whispers" was made available for free download on the IAMX website.The album was then released in Europe on 18 March 2011 where it peaked at #68 in the German Media Control Charts. 

Corner has repeatedly stated that creating Volatile Times was difficult emotionally. He described the album as his most self-indulgent and the peak of his inner struggle with working alone.

Caroline Weber joined the live line-up on drums in 2011, alongside Álvarez on guitars, backing vocals, drums and bass; and Gezang on keyboards/synths, backing vocals and bass for two European tours. The 'Fire And Whispers Tour' in the first half of the year and the 'Into Asylum Tour' in the second half.

On 1 February 2012, it was announced on IAMX's social media that work had officially begun on the fifth studio album, which had the then working title of IAMX5. On 13 May 2012, Corner announced that there would be a vlog posted on the official IAMX YouTube channel every two weeks, which would allow the fans to view the recording process of the new album. In the third vlog, Corner revealed that IAMX5 was to be co-produced by Jim Abbiss. Abbiss had formerly worked alongside Corner to co-produced Sneaker Pimps' debut album, Becoming X, and had gone on tp produce albums for artists such as Adele and Arctic Monkeys.

On 6 July 2012, via his online blog, Corner revealed the name of a track, "Come Home", from the forthcoming album. On 1 October 2012, a fundraising project was launched via the PledgeMusic website, which would allow fans to bid on items such as old tour set lists, drumsticks, signed CDs, and to pre-order the new album with the additional goal of funding a "Making Of" documentary for the album. Essentially, the more that was pledged, the more IAMX would be able to do, and the more cities they would be able to reach on the accompanying tour. The goal of this fundraiser reached its 100% target in one hour, and eventually reached 817% of the set target.

On 19 October 2012, it was announced that the album would officially be named The Unified Field and would be preceded by the title track as the first single alongside the track "Quiet The Mind". Both songs were released on 3 December 2012. The album was released on 20 March, 2013 for fans who pledged on the PledgeMusic project, and 22 March, 2013 to the general public.

Following the album's release, IAMX began the 'Animal Impulses Tour', adding new live members Richard Ankers on drums and Sammi Doll on keyboards and backing vocals. Janine Gezang also returned on keyboards/synths, vocals and bass. The 'Animal Impulses Tour' began in Europe and ended in North America. The first tour back to the states after a four year gap, a feat only made possible through the PledgeMusic campaign.

A second tour in support of the album was announced, but on 16 August 2013, the IAMX management team posted a statement regarding the rescheduling of the 2013 Fall 'Screams Tour' until 2014, as Chris had been diagnosed with chronic primary insomnia and was seeking treatment. Yet, due to ongoing health complications, the 'Screams Tour' was eventually cancelled.The project went dark, with Corner later stating, "In the worst period, I didn't go online; I didn't connect. I became a recluse. [...] I had stopped creating music because I felt like music was my enemy and that it was hurting me psychologically and emotionally: it was too much to deal with." He found solace through the compassion of his fans after posting 'Insomnia Schizophonica'; a blog post in which he detailed the mental health ordeal he had faced. "When I started to recover, I decided to talk about it and I wrote in an online blog about my experiences and it became very clear to me that there was so much support from the fans. So many people could relate to those issues that it gave me so much confidence to go forward and to continue being creative." 

On 2 September 2013, an entirely re-worked version of Volatile Times was digitally released for the United States and Canada. The release included three bonus tracks: "Avalanches", "Volatile Times (IAMseX Unfall Rework)" and "Bernadette (Post Romanian Storm)". 

On 31 May 2014, Chris played a live online acoustic set of songs from Kiss + Swallow which was broadcast worldwide. Then, hinted at a new album during a Q&A session on 17 August 2014, after performing another online acoustic set of songs, this time from The Alternative.

Metanoia and Everything Is Burning (2014–2016) 
On 17 December 2014, a countdown was started on IAMX's social media accounts. The countdown ended three days later, revealing the official announcement of a new PledgeMusic campaign for the next fan-funded album, said to be released in early fall of 2015. On 11 June 2015, the album title was announced as Metanoia. Titular tracks "Insomnia" and "Happiness" were included in the second season of the TV series How to Get Away with Murder, with the songs "Surrender" and "Look Outside" being featured in the third season.

In an interview talking about the album, Corner confirmed that coming out of a long period of insomnia and depression had impacted the album heavily. Describing it as his least complicated and most honest work to date. In October 2015, IAMX began the 'Metanoia Tour', which started in the US, before continuing through Canada and Europe.

On 2 December 2016, the album addendum Everything Is Burning was released, serving as a companion piece to Metanoia with seven previously unreleased tracks and nine remixes of Metanoia songs. Of the songs on Everything Is Burning, Chris said, "They were half written for Metanoia, there was a surplus of material that didn’t make it to the album. It happens with every album that I do, where there are about 5-7 songs that don’t make it. However, these tracks I felt so connected to that I didn’t want to drag them into another era, they had too much of a connection to Metanoia that they had to remain connected and put the album to rest for me. This EP was in many ways me celebrating my strength and victory over that time period." As with Dogmatic Infidel Comedown OK, IAMX handpicked the artists for the remixes on Everything Is Burning. Contributors included previous collaborator Aesthetic Perfection, friend and colleague Gary Numan, and more.

In September 2016, the North American 'Everything Is Burning' tour began. Once again hitting both coasts of the US, Mexico, and Canada, before moving across the Atlantic in October to finish the tour off with a full European leg.

Unfall and Alive In New Light (2017 - 2018) 
On 22 September 2017, Unfall (the German word for 'accident') was released. Chris Corner expanded his sonic palette through remixes for others and his own experimental work. Chris now turned his Unfall alias into the title for an instrumental and abstract album that showcased him working with modular synthesizers and avoiding pop radio formats. During the recording process, Chris connected with famed UK producer and friend Jim Abbiss (Adele/Ladytron/Kasabian/Arctic Monkeys), whom he worked with on Sneaker Pimps debut Becoming X. Both discussed how they were spending their current time exploring and experimenting and agreed that it would be fun to have Jim hang out in Chris’ LA studio for a week and play around.  That turned into a fruitful seven days, as Jim ended up co-writing and co-producing several album tracks: "Running Point", "Trust The Machine", "Cat's Cradle", "Polar I.", "TeddyLion", "11.11", and "The Disease To Please". The last features vocals from The Go Go's rhythm guitarist and vocalist Jane Wiedlin.  Chris and Jane had been looking for something to work together on, and this just came about naturally, according to Chris. The single "Little Deaths" was released on 15 September 2017.

"Mile Deep Hollow", the first single from IAMX's eighth album Alive In New Light, was originally teased by it's feature in How To Get Away With Murder's mid-season finale. It was then officially released on 14 December 2018 alongside its music video.

The title track "Alive in New Light", premiered similarly. Being teased to fans in the very next episode of the aforementioned series, but was released with the album on 2 February 2018. The second single, "Stardust" which features tattoo artist Kat Von D was released on 5 March 2018 alongside another music video.

Corner has said that "this album is about connecting, and it’s a pain in the ass to do it through an album. Each time I do this, I feel exhausted but it’s an impulse I can’t stop. If you write your pain out, there’s a venting. Happiness is a skill. I’m happiest activating skills that keep you balanced.” This longing for connection and balance would inspire Corner to create the IAMX Mental Health Gatherings during this time period.

These Mental Health Gatherings were separate events held prior to IAMX live shows in 2018, with proceeds going to mental health charities, and were a small intimate gathering of fans who wished to share their stories, find acceptance among their peers, and ask Corner and other special guests advice on how to manage their mental health struggles.

Echo Echo (2019–2020)

Machinate and Mile Deep Hollow Tour (2021–2022)

Film, TV, and Video Game Features 
Beyond the fifteen albums under the IAMX alias and the four albums he co-created with Sneaker Pimps, Corner has also composed and produced for the film soundtrack Les Chevaliers du Ciel (2005) under his given name. Which included features from Sue Denim of Robots In Disguise and the band Placebo.

Further, many of Corner's songs have been used in films, TV productions, and in video games. Most notably The Saint (1997), Queer As Folk (2001), Hostel (2005), Grand Theft Auto V (2013), and How To Get Away With Murder (2014) with the later featuring in 16 different songs across the show's six seasons. Those tracks being "I Come with Knives", "The Unified Field", "Cold Red Light (Instrumental)", "Volatile Times (US version)", "Walk with the Noise", "I Salute You Christopher", "Music People", "Happiness", "Dead in This House", "The Great Shipwreck of Life", "Insomnia", "Scars", "Surrender", "Look Outside", "Mile Deep Hollow" and "Alive in New Light".

Documentaries

You Can Be Happy: The Making of The Unified Field (2013) 
A documentary by Danny Drysdale about the making of "The Unified Field" album. A touching, funny and intense insight into the workings of a modern day renaissance project. Featuring rare interviews with Chris Corner, producer Jim Abbiss, the live band members and Sneaker Pimps co-founder Liam Howe, plus special footage of live performances and backstage madness.

Mile Deep Hollow: Tour Documentary (2020) 
The Mile Deep Hollow documentary follows Chris Corner and his live band (Janine Gezang, Sammi Doll, and Jon Siren) from their early rehearsals in Southern California across the globe to Europe then back again to the final show in Los Angeles, California. With behind the scenes footage and detailed interviews, this documentary offers a deeper insight into the music and art project, and marks an unprecedented openness for IAMX in an effort to create a deeper connection with his fans.

Known for colossal live productions that include performance, light, and video art, IAMX shows offer fans a catharsis through the spectacle of stage. Mental health is a core component of the IAMX philosophy, and as a unique feature of this tour, IAMX partnered with The You Rock Foundation to host Mental Health Gatherings at select stops. These gatherings brought fans together to share their experiences and resources, and to find support through the IAMX community.

Patreon 
IAMX started their Patreon campaign in 2019 as a new way to fund the independent nature of the project, and to facilitate more one-on-one fan interactions on a more personalized alternative to social media.

Altruism 
During the 'Mile Deep Hollow' Tour, Corner started the IAMX Mental Health Gatherings, which were separate events held prior to IAMX live shows in 2018, with proceeds going to mental health charities. They were intimate gatherings of fans who wished to share their stories, find acceptance amongst their peers, and ask Corner and other special guests advice on how to manage their mental health struggles.

This later evolved into the IAMX Podcast 'Headnoise' which were online Mental Health Gatherings, sometimes with or sometimes without special guests, which were a way for Corner and his fans to remain connected during the global pandemic and uplift one another by sharing their struggles and advice.

Turmwerk and Silent Valley Studios 
From 2008 until Corner's move to Los Angeles in 2014, IAMX headquarters was located at an old GDR factory outside Berlin. Corner spoke about the move in an interview, saying that he had bought a building which used to be a waterworks factory in the former East Germany. The factory has since been named "Turmwerk" and is used for studio recording, band rehearsals, photo shoots, music video and live visual production. These productions include the music video "My Secret Friend" featuring Imogen Heap, photo shoots for the cover of IAMX's fourth studio album, Volatile Times, shot by Berlin photographer Ben Wolf and press photos for IAMX's fifth studio album, The Unified Field, by photographers Joe Dilworth and Sammi Doll. Corner said in an interview that his dream was to create a place for artists of all kinds where the main focus is on creativity and free thinking.

Band members 

Current members
 Chris Corner – vocals, various instruments, programming, production (2004–present)

Live members
 Janine Gezang (Janine Gebauer until 2009) – keyboards, backing vocals, bass (2006–present)
 Sammi Doll – keyboards, backing vocals (2013–present)
 Jon Siren – drums (2015–present)

Former live members
 Sue Denim – vocals (2004)
 Noel Fielding – bass (2004)
 Julian Barratt – guitar (2004)
 James Cook – keyboards, backing vocals (2004)
 Mary Ambrose – backing vocals (2004)
 Julia Davis – keyboards (2004)
 Dean Rosenzweig – guitar, bass (2006–2010)
 Tom Marsh – drums (2006–2010)
 Alberto Álvarez – guitar, vocals, drums, bass (2010–2013)
 Jon Harper – drums (2010)
 Caroline Weber – drums (2011)
 Richard Ankers – drums (2013–2014)

Discography

Studio albums 
 Kiss + Swallow (Tennis Schallplatten (Germany) / Vision Music (Poland) / Anorak Supersport (Belgium) / Recall (France & US) / Acute Music (Austria) / Loser Friendly (UK)) – 13 July 2004
 The Alternative (61seconds - Major Records (Germany) / Acute Music (Austria) / Vision Music (Poland) / Anorak Supersport (BeNeLux) / Fiction (UK) / Metropolis (US)) – 28 April 2006
 Kingdom of Welcome Addiction (61seconds) – 19 May 2009
 Volatile Times (61seconds/BMG Rights Management) – 18 March 2011
 The Unified Field (61seconds) – 22 March 2013
 Metanoia (Orphic/Caroline International/Universal) – 2 October 2015
 Unfall (Orphic/Caroline International/Universal) – 22 September 2017 (instrumental album)
 Alive In New Light (Orphic/Caroline International/Universal) – 2 February 2018
 Echo Echo (Orphic) – 13 March 2020 (acoustic versions of songs known from previous albums)
 Machinate – 19 November 2021 (live album with new compositions, mostly instrumental, recorded on modular synthesizers)

Concert albums 
 Live in Warsaw (publ. 61seconds) – 14 November 2008
 Mile Deep Hollow Tour (publ. Unfall) – 16 September 2022 (live album from the 2019 tour)

EPs and other albums 
 Your Joy Is My Low (EP, limited edition, publ. Acute Music) – 1 January 2004
 Your Joy Is My Low Remixes (EP, limited edition, publ. Anorak Supersport) – 26 May 2005
 IAMIXED (publ. NoCarbon) – 20 December 2008 (remixes of songs from the album The Alternative performed by English musicians)
 Tear Garden (EP) – 2009
 Dogmatic Infidel Comedown OK (publ. 61seconds) – 19 March 2010 (cover versions and remixes of songs from the album Kingdom of Welcome Addiction)
 Bernadette (EP) – 29 July 2011 (extended reissue on 16 September 2022)
 Volatile Times (EP, limited edition) – 23 September 2011
 Everything Is Burning (Metanoia Addendum) – 2 September 2016 (mini album containing a bonus CD with remixes)
 Mile Deep Hollow (download EP) – 14 December 2018

Singles

Music videos

Charts

References

External links 
 
 

Musicians from London
English electronic musicians
Music in Berlin
Metropolis Records artists
Fiction Records artists